Meldon John Wolfgang (March 20, 1890 – June 30, 1947) was an American professional baseball pitcher. He played all or part of five seasons in Major League Baseball for the Chicago White Sox from 1914 to 1918.

External links

1890 births
1947 deaths
Major League Baseball pitchers
Chicago White Sox players
Albany Senators players
Lowell Tigers players
Lowell Grays players
Denver Bears players
Baseball players from New York (state)
Sportspeople from Albany, New York
Burials at St. Agnes Cemetery